Audubon is a borough in Camden County, in the U.S. state of New Jersey. As of the 2020 United States census, the borough's population was 8,707, a decrease of 112 (−1.3%) from the 2010 census count of 8,819, which in turn reflected a decline of 363 (−4.0%) from the 9,182 counted in the 2000 census.

History 
The area that was to become Audubon was initially settled in the late 17th Century by various land owners and was primarily used for farms and mills. In 1695 the land now known as the Borough of Audubon was part of Newton Township. By the early 1700s, the area's first families were building their homesteads. Today, two of these original farmhouses remain in Audubon. The Low-Stokes-Nicholson house was built  by John Low. Simon Breach built his home, known locally as "The Mansion House", in about 1740. Samuel Nicholson Rhodes, a local naturalist and author, owned this farm, which he named "Cedarcroft", from 1898–1912. It was Mrs. Rhodes who came up with the name for the town. When the Atlantic City Railroad arrived in the 1880s the local farms were subdivided into the smaller communities of Audubon, Cedarcroft and Orston. Residential development began when both Audubon and Orston had train stations built in the 1890s.

On March 13, 1905, through an act of the New Jersey Legislature, Audubon was created as a borough from portions of Haddon Township. It was named for John James Audubon, the naturalist. After a referendum on October 28, 1947, portions of Audubon were taken to form the borough of Audubon Park.

Audubon is the home of three Medal of Honor recipients, the most awarded per capita of any town in the United States: Samuel M. Sampler (World War I), Edward Clyde Benfold (Korean War) and Nelson V. Brittin (Korean War). The three are honored by a memorial at Audubon High School.

Geography
According to the United States Census Bureau, the borough had a total area of 1.50 square miles (3.87 km2), including 1.48 square miles (3.84 km2) of land and 0.01 square miles (0.04 km2) of water (0.93%).

Unincorporated communities, localities and place names located partially or completely within the borough include Orston.

Audubon borders Audubon Park, Haddon Heights, Haddon Township, Haddonfield, Mount Ephraim and Oaklyn.

Climate
The climate in the area is characterized by hot, humid summers and generally mild to cool winters.  According to the Köppen Climate Classification system, Audubon has a humid subtropical climate, abbreviated "Cfa" on climate maps.

Demographics

2010 census

The Census Bureau's 2006–2010 American Community Survey showed that (in 2010 inflation-adjusted dollars) median household income was $73,193 (with a margin of error of +/− $4,305) and the median family income was $89,399 (+/− $4,881). Males had a median income of $61,732 (+/− $4,152) versus $48,036 (+/− $4,880) for females. The per capita income for the borough was $34,243 (+/− $1,815). About 3.6% of families and 6.5% of the population were below the poverty line, including 13.6% of those under age 18 and 6.2% of those age 65 or over.

2000 census
As of the 2000 United States census there were 9,182 people, 3,673 households, and 2,387 families residing in the borough. The racial makeup of the borough was 97.34% White, 1.51% Hispanic or Latino, 0.52% African American, 0.11% Native American, 0.89% Asian, 0.01% Pacific Islander, 0.48% from other races, and 0.64% from two or more races.

There were 3,673 households, out of which 30.9% had children under the age of 18 living with them, 49.6% were married couples living together, 11.8% had a female householder with no husband present, and 35.0% were non-families. 30.3% of all households were made up of individuals, and 13.7% had someone living alone who was 65 years of age or older. The average household size was 2.50 and the average family size was 3.16.

In the borough the population was spread out, with 24.8% under the age of 18, 7.0% from 18 to 24, 31.0% from 25 to 44, 21.3% from 45 to 64, and 15.9% who were 65 years of age or older. The median age was 38 years. For every 100 females, there were 91.7 males. For every 100 females age 18 and over, there were 86.5 males.

The median income for a household in the borough was $49,250, and the median income for a family was $59,115. Males had a median income of $45,650 versus $30,651 for females. The per capita income for the borough was $24,942. About 4.2% of families and 5.5% of the population were below the poverty line, including 6.1% of those under age 18 and 8.4% of those age 65 or over.

Government

Local government
Audubon borough operates under the Walsh Act commission form of New Jersey municipal government. The borough is one of 30 municipalities (of the 564) statewide that use this commission form of government. The governing body is comprised of three commissioners who are elected at-large on a non-partisan basis to serve four-year terms of office on a concurrent basis in elections held as part of the May municipal election. Each commissioner is assigned a specific department to head in addition to their legislative functions and the commissioners select one of their members to serve as mayor.

, the members of the Board of Commissioners are
Mayor Robert Jakubowski (Director of Public Works, Parks and Buildings)
Robert Lee (Director of Public Safety & Affairs)
Jeffrey Whitman (Director of Revenue & Finance), all of whom are serving concurrent terms of office that end on May 10, 2025.

Emergency services 
The Audubon Police Department dates back to 1931, with Police Chief Frank Kelly chosen to lead the borough's first uniformed officers. , the department's chief is Thomas J. Tassi.

The Audubon Fire Department is an all-volunteer unit with 50 members, responding to an average of 300 calls each year in Audubon and portions of surrounding communities, including Audubon Park, Haddon Heights, Mount Ephraim and Oaklyn.

Federal, state and county representation
Audubon is located in the 1st Congressional district and is part of New Jersey's 5th state legislative district.

Politics
As of March 2011, there were a total of 6,215 registered voters in Audubon, of which 2,418 (38.9% vs. 31.7% countywide) were registered as Democrats, 1,113 (17.9% vs. 21.1%) were registered as Republicans and 2,676 (43.1% vs. 47.1%) were registered as Unaffiliated. There were 8 voters registered as Libertarians or Greens. Among the borough's 2010 Census population, 70.5% (vs. 57.1% in Camden County) were registered to vote, including 89.4% of those ages 18 and over (vs. 73.7% countywide).

In the 2012 presidential election, Democrat Barack Obama received 2,718 votes (60.0% vs. 54.8% countywide), ahead of Republican Mitt Romney with 1,704 votes (37.6% vs. 43.5%) and other candidates with 70 votes (1.5% vs. 0.9%), among the 4,527 ballots cast by the borough's 6,618 registered voters, for a turnout of 68.4% (vs. 70.4% in Camden County). In the 2008 presidential election, Democrat Barack Obama received 2,806 votes (59.7% vs. 66.2% countywide), ahead of Republican John McCain with 1,778 votes (37.8% vs. 30.7%) and other candidates with 81 votes (1.7% vs. 1.1%), among the 4,701 ballots cast by the borough's 6,423 registered voters, for a turnout of 73.2% (vs. 71.4% in Camden County). In the 2004 presidential election, Democrat John Kerry received 2,696 votes (56.3% vs. 61.7% countywide), ahead of Republican George W. Bush with 2,021 votes (42.2% vs. 36.4%) and other candidates with 40 votes (0.8% vs. 0.8%), among the 4,791 ballots cast by the borough's 6,091 registered voters, for a turnout of 78.7% (vs. 71.3% in the whole county).

In the 2013 gubernatorial election, Republican Chris Christie received 62.0% of the vote (1,545 cast), ahead of Democrat Barbara Buono with 35.6% (886 votes), and other candidates with 2.4% (59 votes), among the 2,560 ballots cast by the borough's 6,650 registered voters (70 ballots were spoiled), for a turnout of 38.5%. In the 2009 gubernatorial election, Democrat Jon Corzine received 1,275 ballots cast (45.8% vs. 53.8% countywide), ahead of Republican Chris Christie with 1,256 votes (45.1% vs. 38.5%), Independent Chris Daggett with 182 votes (6.5% vs. 4.5%) and other candidates with 47 votes (1.7% vs. 1.1%), among the 2,782 ballots cast by the borough's 6,221 registered voters, yielding a 44.7% turnout (vs. 40.8% in the county).

Education
The Audubon School District serves public school students in pre-kindergarten through twelfth grade. As of the 2020–21 school year, the district, comprised of three schools, had an enrollment of 1,463 students and 122.2 classroom teachers (on an FTE basis), for a student–teacher ratio of 12.0:1. Schools in the district (with 2020–21 enrollment data from the National Center for Education Statistics) are 
Haviland Avenue School with 254 students in grades PreK-2, 
Mansion Avenue School with 372 students in grades 3-6 and 
Audubon High School with 818 students in grades 7-12.

Students from Audubon Park attend the district's schools as part of a sending/receiving relationship established after Audubon Park closed its lone school in 1979. For grades 9–12, students from Mount Ephraim attend Audubon High School, as part of a sending/receiving relationship with the Mount Ephraim Public Schools.

The two schools in Audubon, Haviland Avenue School and Mansion Avenue School had both served Kindergarten to sixth grade. This continued until the 2009–2010 school year when they were reconfigured so that Haviland is K–2 and Mansion serves grades 3–6.

Students from Audubon, and from all of Camden County, are eligible to attend the Camden County Technical Schools, a countywide public school district that serves the vocational and technical education needs of students at the high school and post-secondary level at Gloucester Township Technical High School in Gloucester Township or Pennsauken Technical High School in Pennsauken Township.

Transportation

Roads and highways 

Public transportation 
NJ Transit bus service is available in the borough on routes 400 (between Sicklerville and Philadelphia), 403 (between Turnersville and Camden), 450 (between the Cherry Hill Mall and Camden), and 457 (between the Moorestown Mall and Camden).

Notable people

People who were born in, residents of, or otherwise closely associated with Audubon include:

 Edward Clyde Benfold (1931–1952), a United States Navy sailor who was posthumously awarded the Medal of Honor for his actions during the Korean War
 Nelson V. Brittin (1920–1951), Korean War veteran who was awarded the Medal of Honor posthumously
 Mario Cerrito (born 1984), filmmaker, writer and producer known in the horror/thriller genre
 Joe Flacco (born 1985), NFL quarterback for the New York Jets
 Bill Laxton (born 1948), former MLB pitcher who played in all or part of five seasons in the majors between 1970 and 1977
 Brett Laxton (born 1973), former MLB pitcher who played in parts of two seasons for the Oakland Athletics and the Kansas City Royals
 Edward Longacre (born 1946), historian and writer
 Vic Obeck (1917–1979), football coach and executive
 Merl Reagle (1950–2015), nationally syndicated crossword puzzle constructor
 Samuel M. Sampler (1895–1979), a World War I veteran who was awarded the Medal of Honor
 William Siri (1919–2004), a co-leader of the first American expedition to successfully climb Mount Everest who served as President of the Sierra Club (1964–1966)
 Anne McConaghie Volp (1921–2010), field hockey player and coach, who was a member of the United States women's national field hockey team for 14 years and the team captain for five of those years
 John L. White (1930–2001), politician who served in the New Jersey General Assembly and New Jersey Senate

References

External links

 Borough of Audubon

 
1905 establishments in New Jersey
Boroughs in Camden County, New Jersey
Populated places established in 1905
Walsh Act